Katerina Michalopoulou (born c. 1972), in Greek: Κατερίνα Μιχαλοπούλου, was the winner of the "Greek Woman 1991" title (Greek: "Ελληνίδα 1991") in the Star Hellas/Miss Hellas/Miss Young Pageant in 1991.  She went on to compete in Dakar, Senegal for the 1991 Miss Europe beauty pageant and came in 1st runner-up.  Susane Petry of Germany, who originally won the pageant, was later disqualified and the title went to Katerina.

References

1960s births
Living people
Greek female models
Miss Europe winners
Greek beauty pageant winners